Collema flaccidum is a species of lichen belonging to the family Collemataceae.

References

Peltigerales
Lichen species
Lichens described in 1795
Taxa named by Erik Acharius